Thomas Edward Walter (born October 30, 1970) is an American musician and songwriter, best known for his alternative rock band, Abandoned Pools, as well as being the former bassist and one of the founding members of Eels.

Early years and Eels 
Tommy Walter was raised in Westlake Village. His father was an airplane pilot; his mother a stewardess. His father is from Canada, and was almost 47 when Tommy was born. He grew up in a modest, middle-class household. He began playing bass at a young age, and was formally trained on the French horn in college. He attended the University of Southern California, followed by Pacific University. He began teaching classical music theory, and worked with local Los Angeles area musicians.

He met with singer-songwriter Mark Oliver Everett (known as E), and Butch Norton and formed Eels. Prior to their founding, E had already released two records by himself, under his single-letter pseudonym, and their name was decided upon so that their music would be placed next to E's solo works. However, it was in retrospect that they realized that there were bands that would be placed in between, such as Eagles.

Their collaborations led to refining songs that E had previously written, as well as creating new material. They released their debut album, Beautiful Freak, in 1996. However, after a year of touring, Walter left the band. In an interview, he stated his dissatisfaction with E's personality, and the loss of the amount of creative input that both Butch and himself had prior to the success of Beautiful Freak.

Soon after, he formed a band called Metromax. They shortly changed their name to Tely, and released an album over the Internet. However, the band didn't garner much success, and it soon evolved into Walter's solo project, Abandoned Pools.

History

Humanistic (2001–2004) 
Walter, using new material, as well as several songs he had worked on beforehand in both Tely and Metromax, composed, recorded, and released his solo album, Humanistic, in 2001 on Extasy Records. While being the creative force behind the project, other musicians contributed to the project, such as Angie Hart of Frente!, who sang backing vocals to "Start Over," "Ruin Your Life," "Sunny Day," and "Seed."

Although a solo project, he recruited a touring band, featuring Leah Randi and Bryan Head filling out the ranks of bassist and drummer, respectively. They had several successful tours, going across the country and headlining with acts such as Garbage, A Perfect Circle and Lenny Kravitz. They also appeared on The Late Late Show with Craig Kilborn and two videos, "Mercy Kiss", and "The Remedy", were released. Monster, another video, was composed of shots taken while on touring, but wasn't released for years, via MTV's website.

In 2002 they performed the theme song for the short-lived Teletoon (also broadcast on MTV) animated series Clone High.   Many of their songs can be heard in the background during the show. Walter also voiced himself in a brief appearance in the final episode. After Clone High was dropped by MTV, however, the band stopped its touring.

Armed to the Teeth (2005–2007)
While keeping in touch with his fanbase and caring for his sick cat, Iggy, Walter began working on material over the next few years, preparing to release another album. After a relationship of his came to a rough conclusion, he was picked up by Universal, and wrote several new songs for his next album, citing his personal life, as well as politics, as his main inspirations.

Teaming up with Bryan Head once more and bringing in guitarist Sean Woolstenhulme, Walter started work in 2004 to record his next album. In June 2005 they released an EP, consisting of a few songs from the new album along with b-sides and demos, called The Reverb EP. This was followed by the full album, Armed to the Teeth, in September 2005

In January 2006, Walter wrote in his online journal that Universal Records had stopped promoting the album. He subsequently quit the label, also noting that Abandoned Pools is once again a one-man project. He has since created two side projects—Glacier Hiking, an alternative rock band, and Oliver the Penguin, an electronica project.

Sublime Currency (2011–2012)
On May 3, 2011, Abandoned Pools released the song "In Silence", available in all digital stores, as the first single from the upcoming album Sublime Currency.  On June 7, 2011, the second single, "Marigolds" was released in all digital stores.

On January 30, 2012, Abandoned Pools revealed that they had signed onto a new record label, Tooth & Nail Records, and that Sublime Currency  would be released under this label. They also mentioned that the release date of the third album will be revealed "soon".

It was revealed on May 17, 2012, that Sublime Currency would feature 11 tracks. On July 10, 2012, it was revealed that Sublime Currency would be released on August 28, 2012, and the final artwork for the album was shown.

On July 26, 2012, the album's title track premiered on Alternative Press' website. On August 14, 2012, the track was officially released as the album's third single. The next day, the track "Unrehearsed" was made free to download on RCRD LBL's website. On August 22, 2012, the track "Behemoth" premiered on CMJ's website.

Sublime Currency was released on August 28, 2012, and a music video for the single "Sublime Currency" was released on September 7.

Somnambulist (2013)
On June 6, 2013, the Abandoned Pools Twitter account announced that the band's next LP, entitled Somnambulist, will be released on July 2, 2013. Shortly after, it was announced that album will be delayed by a week, and will instead be released on July 9, 2013.

On November 26, 2013, Abandoned Pools released a cover of the Christmas song "The First Noel" through the album Hype Music Presents Holidays, Vol. 1.

Upcoming 5th album 
On April 6, 2021, Walter released a Kickstarter campaign for making a potential 5th album, 8 years after his last album, Somnambulist, due to articles explaining that a reboot of MTV's Clone High is going to be released on HBO Max. The Kickstarter included a video which contained audio demos of the songs that would be recorded for said album. 
  
The campaign was a success getting a total of $43,782 from 486 backers. 
  
Then, a month later he would go on to transfer the campaign to Indiegogo. The success continued and the campaign managed to get to a total of $44,606 from 498 backers.

Solo
On July 29, 2020, Walter released the instrumental album Supraliminal on the Position Music label.

Discography

Eels

Abandoned Pools 

Full-length

EPs

Glacier Hiking

Oliver the Penguin

Solo

Music videos

Abandoned Pools

See also 
Clone High
Eels

References

External links 
 
 Abandoned Pools on MySpace
 Abandoned Pools at LastFM
 Abandoned Pools at Bandcamp

1970 births
American rock guitarists
American male guitarists
American rock songwriters
American rock singers
Eels (band) members
American indie rock musicians
Living people
Pacific University alumni
Tooth & Nail Records artists
Warner Records artists
Guitarists from Los Angeles
21st-century American singers
American people of Canadian descent
Singer-songwriters from California